The following is a list of Bahamian Films or Films made in the Bahamas. Jefford Curré Paradise Intrigue is the historical flagship film that kick-started the Bahamas Film Industry.

List of films 
Jefford Curré Paradise Intrigue is the historical flagship film that kick-started the Bahamas Film Industry.

List of films shot in the Bahamas

References

External links
Bahamian film at the Internet Movie Database

Bahamas

Films
Society of the Bahamas